Tanjong Pagar Single Member Constituency was a single member constituency (SMC) in Tanjong Pagar, Singapore. The constituency was formed in 1955 and was abolished in 1991. It was one of the longest-surviving constituencies since the pre-independence era, and has been a People's Action Party stronghold. Throughout its history, the seat was only held by the late Prime Minister Lee Kuan Yew, who held the longest political term  in Parliament from 1955 to 2015.

History 
In 1955, the Tanjong Pagar constituency was formed. It took over Sepoy Lines in 1976 and Anson in 1988. After Lee Kuan Yew had passed the premiership to Goh Chok Tong in 1990, the constituency was even merged into Tanjong Pagar GRC, and the legacy of the "Tanjong Pagar GRC" name continues to remain even after the death of Lee Kuan Yew in 2015. 1988 was also the last election of which Tanjong Pagar was contested during Lee Kuan Yew's time, following which during the final 24 years of Lee Kuan Yew in Tanjong Pagar GRC, the constituency was declared as walkover.

Member of Parliament

Elections

Elections in the 1980s

Elections in the 1970s

Elections in the 1960s

Elections in the 1950s

Historical maps

References
1988 General Election's result
1984 General Election's result
1980 General Election's result
1976 General Election's result
1972 General Election's result
1968 General Election's result
1963 General Election's result
1959 General Election's result
1955 General Election's result

Singaporean electoral divisions
Ang Mo Kio